The Atoyac web-footed salamander (Bolitoglossa oaxacensis) is a species of salamander in the family Plethodontidae.
It is endemic to Mexico.
Its natural habitats are subtropical or tropical moist montane forests and heavily degraded former forest.
It is threatened by habitat loss.

References

Bolitoglossa
Endemic amphibians of Mexico
Taxonomy articles created by Polbot
Amphibians described in 2002